Tömönkü Ala-Archa is a village in the Alamüdün District, Chüy Region of Kyrgyzstan. Its population was 10,760 in 2021. It was established in 1947.

Population

References

Populated places in Chüy Region